Verőce is a village and commune in Pest County in Hungary. From 1976 to 1990 the village of Verőce was merged with the village of Kismaros, to create a new merged settlement called Verőcemaros. This settlement was disestablished in 1990, when the two villages were again separated and Verőce again became a separate settlement.

Sights 
 The riverside system of retaining walls, first started based on the plans of famous Hungarian architect Miklós Ybl.

Populated places in Pest County